This is a list of women who served as governors of states and territories of Australia.

As of January 2020, ten women have served or are serving as the governor of an Australian state. The governors are the representatives of Australia's monarch in each of Australia's six states. The governors are the nominal chief executives of the states, performing the same constitutional and ceremonial functions at the state level as does the Governor-General of Australia at the national or federal level. The state governors are not subject to the constitutional authority of the governor-general, but are directly responsible to the monarch. 

Two women have served as Administrator of the Northern Territory, an official appointed by the Governor-General of Australia to represent the government of the Commonwealth in the Northern Territory who performs functions similar to those of a state governor. However, the Administrator is not the direct representative of the Monarch in the Territory as territories are not sovereign in the same way as states.

The first female governor in Australia was Dame Roma Mitchell in South Australia in 1991. To date, Australia has had one female Governor-general, Dame Quentin Bryce, who previously served as Governor of Queensland. 

Since 1 November 2021, excluding the Governor of Western Australia, the remaining 5 state governors and the Administrator of the Northern Territory are all female, which is unprecedented in the Australian history.

List of female state governors

See also
Women and government in Australia

References

.
Australia
Australia
Australia